Box braids are a type of hair-braiding style that is predominantly popular among African people and the African diaspora. This type of hairstyle is a "protective style" (a style which can be worn for a long period of time to let natural hair grow and protect the ends of the hair) and is "boxy", consisting of square-shaped hair divisions. Box braids are generally installed by using synthetic hair which helps to add thickness as well as helping the natural hair that is in the braid. Because they are not attached to the scalp like other similar styles such as cornrows, box braids can be styled in a number of different ways. The installation process of box braids can be lengthy, but once installed they can last for six to eight weeks. They are known for being easy to maintain.

History
Hair-braiding styles were used to help differentiate tribes, locations, and also possibly a symbol of wealth and power due to the amount of effort that went into styling braids. Box braids were not given a specific name until the 1990s when popularized by R&B musician Janet Jackson, but have been used for years. This style of braiding comes from the Eembuvi braids of Namibia or the chin-length bob braids of the women of the Nile Valley from over 3,000 years ago. In the Mbalantu tribe of Namibia, braiding was an important social practice. Older women would gather with their girls and teach them how to braid. Box braids are also commonly worn by the Khoisan people of South Africa and the Afar people in the horn of Africa. In Africa, braid styles and patterns have been used to distinguish tribal membership, marital status, age, wealth, religion and social ranking. In some countries of Africa, the braids were used for communication. In some Caribbean islands, braid patterns were used to map routes to escape slavery. Layers of finely chopped tree bark and oils can be used to support the hairstyle. Human hair was at one point wefted into fiber wig caps made of durable materials like wool and felt for reuse in traditional clothing as well as different rituals. Cowry shells, jewels, beads and other material items adorned box braids of older women alluding to their readiness to have daughters, emulation of wealth, high priesthood and any other classifications.

Cultural association and value
Hair was and is a very important and symbolic part of different African communities. Africans believed that hair could help with divine communication as it was the elevated part of one's body. Hair styling was entrusted only to close relatives, as it was explained that if a strand fell into the hands of an enemy, harm could come to the hair's owner. Members of royalty would often wear elaborate hairstyles as a symbol of their stature, and those in mourning, usually women, would pay some attention to their hair during the period of grieving. Hair was seen as a symbol of fertility, as thick, long tresses and neat, clean hair symbolised ability to bear healthy daughters. Elaborate patterns were done for special occasions like weddings, social ceremonies or war preparations. People belonging to a tribe could easily be identified by another tribe member with the help of a braid pattern or style.

Box braids in the US military 
The U.S. Army has strong regulations and restrictions on hairstyles for both men and women. In 2014, the army reviewed its policies and made changes to it. There were concerns and comments that these regulations were too restrictive for African American women. It originally considered their natural hair "not neat" and the protective styles "unprofessional". The previous maximum was a diameter of approximately ". This gives more opportunity to wear protective styles. The parting must be square or rectangular shape. The ends of the braids must be secured. Once the newly grown natural hair outside of the braid, also known as new growth, reaches , the style must be redone. All of these regulations are the same for similar styles like dreadlocks, flat twists, and braids with natural hair. These hairstyles must not interfere with the wear of uniform or covers. The synthetic hair for box braids can come in any color but in the military, they must be natural hair colors without any additional jewelry like hairclips or beads.

See also 
 Braid (hairstyle)
 Cornrows
 Dreadlocks
 French braid
 List of hairstyles

References

External links 
 

African-American hair
Afro-textured hair
Braid hairstyles